Telespazio Germany GmbH is a European aerospace company, founded in 1978. The company provides consulting, technology and engineering services in aerospace missions for ESOC (European Space Operations Centre, Darmstadt), EUMETSAT (European Organisation for the Exploitation of Meteorological Satellites, Darmstadt) and the German Aerospace Center (DLR).

Telespazio Germany is a subsidiary of Telespazio SpA. The Telespazio group is part of the Space Business Unit within Leonardo.

Office sites

Darmstadt (Hessen) 
Headquarters  is near  the European Space Operations Centre (ESOC) and the European Organisation for the Exploitation of Meteorological Satellites (EUMETSAT).

Gilching (Bavaria) 
Office site in Gilching, near the German Space Operations Centre(GSOC) in Oberpfaffenhofen/Weßling (Bavaria).

History 
Telespazio Germany was established in 2012 when Telespazio Deutschland and VEGA Space GmbH were merged. The roots of Telespazio Deutschland may be traced back to the Thomson CSF Group (now Thales), having been active in space missions since the early 1970s.  VEGA, on the other hand, had its first contract with ESOC in 1978. So Telespazio Germany has around 40 years experience in spaceflight.
 2012: The German company VEGA Space GmbH merges with Telespazio Deutschland in Telespazio VEGA Deutschland
 2012: VEGA Space Ltd changes its name in Telespazio VEGA UK
 2011: VEGA Space becomes part of Telespazio
 2010: The German VEGA is split into two companies: VEGA Space GmbH and VEGA Deutschland
 2008: VEGA Group PLC is bought by Finmeccanica
 2007: VEGA Group acquires Anite Deutschland GmbH & Co KG in Köln. 
 2005: Thales and Finmeccanica form the Space Alliance – merger between Telespazio and the space services division of Alcatel – Telespazio Deutschland is formed
 2004: VEGA Group acquires Anite Systems GmbH
 2001: Thales acquires Alcatel Space
 2000: Thales acquires Thomson CSF
 1992: VEGA Group PLC floats on the London stock exchange
 1978: VEGA receives its first Operations Engineering contract with ESOC
 1974: Alcatel Space receives first contract with ESOC

Missions and programs

Mission involvements

Programs 
 HETEREX: Leading of the project HETEREX which was funded by BWT (Bundesministerium für Wirtschaft und Technologie), the project executing organisation was DLR. The project ended in 2013.
 Space Data Routers: Leading of the group 4 "Link Layer Implementation"
 Space Situational Awareness (SSA): Telespazio Germany (formerly VEGA Space) was rewarded with the initial hardware and software components of the Combined Air Operations Centre in Uedem (Nordrhein-Westfalen).
 EGS-CC – The European Ground Systems Common Corecontract was conducted by a consortium of 20 companies from ten European countries under the leadership of Telespazio Germany.

Shareholdings and memberships

Shareholdings 
Telespazio Germany is a shareholder in Centre for Satellite Navigation in Hessen (cesah)

Memberships 
Telespazio Germany is an active member in the following associations:
 BavAIRia
 Bundesverband der Deutschen Luft- und Raumfahrtindustrie 
 Deutsche Gesellschaft für Ortung und Navigation (DGON)
 Deutsche Gesellschaft für Wehrtechnik (DWT)
 Eurospace
 SpaceOps

Competences

Aerospace/space 
Telespazio Germany supports and operates several spacecraft for ESA and DLR. Aerospace is the most important segment with more than 80% sales volume.

Civil aviation 
Telespazio Germany works on programs with Deutsche Flugsicherung (DFS) and Frankfurt Airport. Up to 2013 the company led HETEREX-project.

Military aviation 
Development of training systems for training of pilots and technicians as cockpit procedure trainer for the CH53-GA helicopter and a virtual maintenance trainer for helicopter NH90 /MRH90.

Applications 
Development of applications for satellite-based positioning used by automatic precision guidance system in agriculture for German Agricultural Society (Deutsche Landwirtschafts-Gesellschaft, commonly known as DLG) and John Deere
Also, Telespazio Germany has contributed to the project agriloc through its expertise in Satellite Communication, meaning the provision of reliable connectivity to precision agriculture applications of farms and agricultural machinery in the countryside. Agriloc is a project within the ARTES 20 (Integrated Applications Promotion) programme, funded by the European Space Agency (ESA) and the German Space Agency (DLR).

See also 
 Leonardo-Finmeccanica

References 

Aerospace companies of Germany
Leonardo S.p.A.
Technology companies established in 1978
1978 establishments in Germany
Privately held companies of Germany
Joint ventures
Companies based in Hesse
Darmstadt